Saint Bertha of Bingen (German: Heilige Berta, died ca. 757) was the mother of Rupert of Bingen. Her biography was written, and subsequently her cult popularized, by Hildegard of Bingen, who lived in the same region, about four hundred years later. Bertha and Rupert share a feast day on 15 May.

Bertha von Bingen
Bertha was a descendant of the dukes of Lorraine, and had considerable property along the rivers Rhine and Nahe. She married Robolaus, a pagan, who died when their son Rupert was three years old. Bertha then retired to today's Rupertsberg with her son and the priest Wigbert. She built a small church and led a secluded life with much vigilance and fasting, gave the needy some of her wealth and gradually gathered other people to follow her example.

Bertha devoted her energy to educating Rupert. Following a pilgrimage to Rome, she gave away the rest of her possessions and came to live near Bingen (called Rupertsberg after her son). Rupert died at age 20, but Bertha outlived him by 25 years spent in prayer, fasting, and good works.

Rupert of Bingen
Rupert of Bingen (German : Rupert von Bingen) (712–732) was the son of Bertha of Bingen, a Christian noblewoman. His father was a pagan called Robolaus (Robold). After his death, their child was raised as a Christian by his mother.

At the age of fifteen, Rupert undertook a pilgrimage to Rome with his mother.  After his return, he used his inherited wealth to found churches, living with his mother on a hill at the river Nahe, near Bingen that came to be called the "Rupertsberg". There they established several hospices for the poor and needy. Rupert died from a fever, aged 20. He is regarded as a patron saint of pilgrims.

Veneration
The little church on the Rupertsberg became a place of pilgrimage and was still standing when Hildegard founded a monastery there around 1150. Hildegard moved, with her nuns, from Disibodenberg to the Rupertsberg, a crag at the confluence of the Nahe and the Rhine, and established a monastery on the site of the ruined castle, where Bertha and Rupert were buried. The Vita Sancti Ruperti was written about this time, "...to revive the cult of St. Rupert and to legitimize the vision that called her to move there".

The monastery at Rupertsberg was destroyed in 1632, during the Thirty Years' War. Their relics were transferred to Eibingen.  Bertha's head is kept in the Hildegard Church; Rupert's arm is on display in a reliquary in Eibingen church. Other relics were brought back to Bingen in 1814, where they are venerated in the chapel on the Rochusberg.

Rupertsberg

Rupertsberg is a crag at the confluence of the Nahe and the Rhine, in Bingen am Rhein. It is named for Saint Rupert of Bingen, son of Bertha of Bingen.    It is notable as the site of the first convent founded by Saint Hildegard of Bingen, in 1150, after leaving the monastery at Disibodenberg. She acquired the land from Hermann, dean of Mainz, and Count Bernhard of Hildesheim, plus various smaller gifts. The convent chapel was consecrated by Archbishop Henry of Mainz in 1152.  The charters were drawn up in 1158 by Archbishop Arnold of Mainz. In 1171, Archbishop Christian of Mainz extended tax concessions to the convent. The ruins of the monastery were destroyed to make way for a railway track in 1857.

References

Sources
 Herbert J. Thurston and Donald Attwater, eds. Butler's Lives of the Saints, vol. 2. Allen, TX: Christian Classics, 1956. Page 322.
 Anne H. King-Lenzmeier: Hildegard of Bingen: An Integrated Vision. Liturgical Press, Colledgeville 2001, S. 122.

Literature
 Werner Lauter: Rupert von Bingen. In: Biographisch-Bibliographisches Kirchenlexikon (BBKL). Band 8, Bautz, Herzberg 1994, Sp. 1018–1021.
 Ernst Probst: Hildegard von Bingen - Die deutsche Prophetin. GRIN, München/Ravensburg 2010, S. 19, 20 & 52.

External links
 http://www.santiebeati.it/dettaglio/92398
 http://www.santiebeati.it/dettaglio/92774
 http://www.hildegard.org/rupert/rupert.html
 http://kirchensite.de/fragen-glauben/heiligenkalender/heiligenkalender-einzeldarstellung/datum/2000/05/15/heiliger-rupert-von-bingen/

Medieval German saints
750s deaths
8th-century Christian saints
Year of birth unknown
Female saints of medieval Germany
8th-century Frankish women
8th-century Frankish nobility